Ghazaleh (Persian / Arabic: غزالة‎) may refer to:

Ghazaleh (name), also Gazalé, Ghazalé, and Gazaleh
Ghazaleh, Iran, a village in Khuzestan Province, Iran
Beit Ghazaleh, a historic house in Aleppo, Syria
Deir Ghazaleh, a village in the West Bank
Khirbet Ghazaleh, a town in Syria
Ghazaleh, a village in the Akkar District of Lebanon

See also
 Ghazal (disambiguation)
 Ghazileh, Syria